These are the results of the Men's High Jump event at the 2001 World Championships in Athletics in Edmonton, Alberta, Canada.

Medalists

Schedule
All times are Mountain Standard Time (UTC-7)

Results

Qualification
5 August

Qualification standard: 2.29 m or at least 12 best.

Note: Javier Sotomayor had originally qualified for the final with 2.27 m but was later disqualified for doping.

Final
8 August

Note: Javier Sotomayor had originally finished in the 4th place with 2.33 m but was later disqualified for doping.

References
Results
IAAF

High Jump
High jump at the World Athletics Championships